Justin Caine Burnett (born May 2, 1973) is an American film and video game music composer.

Career
Justin Burnett started his career working for Hans Zimmer from 1995 through 2000. During this tenure he worked on films such as Broken Arrow, As Good as it Gets, The Prince of Egypt, The Road to El Dorado,  and Gladiator. From 2000 through present day, Burnett is also known for his work with film composer Harry Gregson-Williams. With Harry Gregson-Williams, Burnett has worked on films such as Spy Game, Phone Booth, Veronica Guerin, Passionada, Man on Fire, Déjà Vu, The Taking of Pelham 123, Unstoppable, and Cowboys & Aliens. Additionally, Burnett also worked with Walter Werzowa at Musikvergnuegen from 2000 to 2005 on many commercials, movie trailers and network branding projects.

Film scoring
Justin Burnett scored his first feature film Possums which was featured in 1998 at the Sundance Film Festival. His second notable film was Dungeons & Dragons and was released in theaters in 2000. Ending his time at Remote Control Productions, it was 2000 that Burnett began his collaboration with Harry Gregson-Williams. In 2005, Burnett composed the music for the film An American Haunting under the pseudonym Caine Davidson. Since then, Burnett has composed the music for many other films such as I'll Always Know What You Did Last Summer, Iron Cross, Crave, Java Heat as well as many others.

Discography

Film

Additional music credits

TV series

Video games

References

External links

1973 births
20th-century American composers
20th-century American male musicians
21st-century American composers
21st-century American male musicians
American film score composers
Living people
American male film score composers
Place of birth missing (living people)
Video game composers